NZL may refer to:

 New Zealand
Zhalantun Chengjisihan Airport, IATA code NZL